The John C. Proctor Recreation Center was constructed in Peoria, Illinois, United States in 1913. The Classical Revival center was built per the provisions of its founders will, John C. Proctor. It was designed by Hewitt & Emerson.  The building was added to the National Register of Historic Places on September 6, 1979.

The building is a facility operated by the Peoria Parks District.  Facilities include a swimming pool, two gymnasiums, an auditorium, outdoor basketball courts, a playground, and the African American Hall of Fame Museum.

Notes

External links
 Proctor Recreation Center - Peoria Parks District

National Register of Historic Places in Peoria County, Illinois
Museums in Peoria County, Illinois
African-American museums in Illinois
Tourist attractions in Peoria, Illinois
Swimming venues in Illinois
Sports venues on the National Register of Historic Places in Illinois
Sports venues in Peoria, Illinois
1913 establishments in Illinois
Sports venues completed in 1913